FC SKAD-Yalpuh Bolhrad was a professional Ukrainian football club from the city of Bolhrad, Odessa oblast. The club's acronym SKAD stands for Sport Club of Aeromobile Division, while Yalpuh is the name of a nearby river and a lake.

History

The club has been playing in the regional league for fourteen years.

The club competed in the Ukrainian Amateur championship in 2011.

The club submitted a license to the Professional Football League of Ukraine and was accepted into the Ukrainian Second League for the 2011–12 season. 

However, preparations for the 2012 spring session of the Druha Liha A competition were halted when the club informed the PFL that due to lack of financial backing the club was withdrawing from the competition.

Future plans

Also a modern hotel is planned to be built for visiting teams and two new training fields.

League and cup history

{|class="wikitable"
|-bgcolor="#efefef"
! Season
! Div.
! Pos.
! Pl.
! W
! D
! L
! GS
! GA
! P
!Domestic Cup
!colspan=2|Europe
!Notes
|-
|align=center|2011
|align=center|4th
|align=center|5
|align=center|10
|align=center|1
|align=center|1
|align=center|8
|align=center|4
|align=center|25
|align=center|4
|align=center|
|align=center|
|align=center|
|align=center| 
|-
|align=center|2011–12
|align=center|3rd "A"
|align=center|14
|align=center|26
|align=center|2
|align=center|1
|align=center|23
|align=center|10
|align=center|54
|align=center|7
|align=center|1/64 finals
|align=center|
|align=center|
|align=center bgcolor=pink|Withdrew
|}

References

 
Defunct football clubs in Ukraine
Football clubs in Odesa Oblast
Izmail
Bolhrad Raion
Association football clubs established in 1950
Association football clubs disestablished in 2012
1950 establishments in Ukraine
2012 disestablishments in Ukraine